Zhu Lin was the defending champion, but chose to participate at the 2019 US Open instead.

You Xiaodi won the title, defeating Kaylah McPhee in the final, 6–3, 7–6(7–5).

Seeds

Draw

Finals

Top half

Bottom half

References

External Links
Main Draw

Jinan International Open - Singles